Jan Łukasiewicz (21 December 1878 – 13 February 1956) was a Polish logician and philosopher who is best known for Polish notation and Łukasiewicz logic  His work centred on philosophical logic, mathematical logic and history of logic.  He thought innovatively about traditional propositional logic, the principle of non-contradiction and the law of excluded middle, offering one of the earliest systems of many-valued logic. Contemporary research on Aristotelian logic also builds on innovative works by Łukasiewicz, which applied methods from modern logic to the formalization of Aristotle's syllogistic.

The Łukasiewicz approach was reinvigorated in the early 1970s in a series of papers by John Corcoran and Timothy Smiley that inform modern translations of Prior Analytics by Robin Smith in 1989 and Gisela Striker in 2009. Łukasiewicz is regarded as one of the most important historians of logic.

Life 
He was born in Lemberg in Austria-Hungary (now Lviv, Ukraine) and was the only child of Paweł Łukasiewicz, a captain in the Austrian army, and Leopoldina, née Holtzer, the daughter of a civil servant. His family was Roman Catholic.

He finished his gymnasium studies in philology and in 1897 went on to Lemberg University, where he studied philosophy and mathematics. He was a pupil of the philosopher Kazimierz Twardowski.

In 1902, he received a Doctor of Philosophy degree under the patronage of Emperor Franz Joseph I of Austria, who gave him a special doctoral ring with diamonds.

He spent three years as a private teacher, and in 1905, he received a scholarship to complete his philosophy studies at the University of Berlin and the University of Louvain in Belgium.

Łukasiewicz continued studying for his habilitation qualification and in 1906 submitted his thesis to the University of Lemberg. That year, he was appointed a lecturer at the University of Lemberg, where he was eventually appointed Extraordinary Professor by Emperor Franz Joseph I. He taught there until the First World War.

In 1915, he was invited to lecture as a full professor at the University of Warsaw, which the German occupation authorities had reopened after it had been closed down by the Tsarist government in the 19th century.

In 1919, Łukasiewicz left the university to serve as Polish Minister of Religious Denominations and Public Education in Paderewski's government until 1920. Łukasiewicz led the development of a Polish curriculum replacing the Russian, German and Austrian curricula that had been used in partitioned Poland. The Łukasiewicz curriculum emphasized the early acquisition of logical and mathematical concepts.

In 1928, he married Regina Barwińska.

He remained a professor at the University of Warsaw from 1920 until 1939, when the family house was destroyed by German bombs, and the university was closed by the German occupation. He had been a rector of the university twice during which Łukasiewicz and Stanisław Leśniewski had founded the Lwów–Warsaw school of logic, which was later made famous internationally by Alfred Tarski, who had been a student of Leśniewski.

During the start of the Second World War, he worked at the Warsaw Underground University. After the Nazi occupation authorities had closed the university, he earned a meager living in the Warsaw city archive. His friendship with Heinrich Scholz (German professor of mathematical logic) helped him, too, and it was Scholz who arranged for the Łukasiewicz family's passage to Germany in 1944 (Łukasiewicz was fearful of the Red Army advance). Jan Łukasiewicz and his wife wanted to move to Switzerland but were unable to get permission from the German authorities. They thus spent the last months of the war in Münster, Germany. After the end of the war, unwilling to return to a Soviet-controlled Poland, they moved first to Belgium, where Łukasiewicz taught logic at a provisional Polish Scientific Institute.

In February 1946, at the invitation of Irish political leader Éamon de Valera, Łukasiewicz and his wife relocated to Dublin, where they remained until his death there a decade later.  In Ireland, he briefly served as Professor of Mathematical Logic at the Royal Irish Academy (a position created for him). His duties involved giving frequent public lectures.

During this period, his book Elements of Mathematical Logic was published in English by Macmillan (1963, translated from Polish by Olgierd Wojtasiewicz).

Jan Łukasiewicz died on 13 February 1956.  He was buried in Mount Jerome Cemetery, in Dublin. At the urging of the Armenian community in Poland, his remains were repatriated to Poland 66 years later. He was reburied on 22 November 2022 in Warsaw's Old Powązki Cemetery.

From October to December 2022, the Royal Irish Academy in Dublin hosted an exhibition on his life and work.

Łukasiewicz's papers (post-1945) are held by the University of Manchester Library.

Work 
A number of axiomatizations of classical propositional logic are due to Łukasiewicz. A particularly elegant axiomatization features a mere three axioms and is still invoked to the present day. He was a pioneer investigator of multi-valued logics; his three-valued propositional calculus, introduced in 1917, was the first explicitly axiomatized non-classical logical calculus. He wrote on the philosophy of science, and his approach to the making of scientific theories was similar to the thinking of Karl Popper.

Łukasiewicz invented the Polish notation (named after his nationality) for the logical connectives around 1920. There is a quotation from his paper, Remarks on Nicod's Axiom and on "Generalizing Deduction", page 180;

The reference cited by Łukasiewicz above is apparently a lithographed report in Polish. The referring paper by Łukasiewicz Remarks on Nicod's Axiom and on "Generalizing Deduction", originally published in Polish in 1931, was later reviewed by H. A. Pogorzelski in the Journal of Symbolic Logic in 1965.

In Łukasiewicz's 1951 book, Aristotle's Syllogistic from the Standpoint of Modern Formal Logic, he mentions that the principle of his notation was to write the functors before the arguments to avoid brackets (i.e., parentheses) and that he had employed his notation in his logical papers since 1929. He then goes on to cite, as an example, a 1930 paper he wrote with Alfred Tarski on the sentential calculus.

This notation is the root of the idea of the recursive stack, a last-in, first-out computer memory store proposed by several researchers including Turing, Bauer and Hamblin, and first implemented in 1957. In 1960, Łukasiewicz's notation concepts and stacks were used as the basis of the Burroughs B5000 computer designed by Robert S. Barton and his team at Burroughs Corporation in Pasadena, California. The concepts also led to the design of the English Electric multi-programmed KDF9 computer system of 1963, which had two such hardware register stacks. A similar concept underlies the reverse Polish notation (RPN, a postfix notation) of the Friden EC-130 calculator and its successors, many Hewlett Packard calculators, the Lisp and Forth programming languages, and the PostScript page description language.

Recognition

In 2008 the Polish Information Processing Society established the Jan Łukasiewicz Award, to be presented to the most innovative Polish IT companies.

From 1999 to 2004, the Department of Computer Science building at UCD was called the Łukasiewicz Building, until all campus buildings were renamed after the disciplines they  housed.

His model of 3-valued logic allowed for formulating Kleene's ternary logic and a meta-model of empiricism, mathematics and logic, i.e. senary logic.

Chronology
 1878 born in Lemberg (now Lviv)
 1890–1902 studies with Kazimierz Twardowski in Lemberg (Lwów, L'viv)
 1902 doctorate (mathematics and philosophy), University of Lemberg with the highest distinction possible
 1906 habilitation thesis completed, University of Lemberg
 1906 becomes a lecturer
 1910 essays on the principle of non-contradiction and the excluded middle
 1911 extraordinary professor at Lemberg
 1915 invited to the newly reopened University of Warsaw
 1916 new Kingdom of Poland declared
 1917 develops three-valued propositional calculus
 1919 Polish Minister of Education
 1920–1939 professor at Warsaw University founds with Stanisław Leśniewski the Lwów–Warsaw school of logic (see also Alfred Tarski, Stefan Banach, Hugo Steinhaus, Zygmunt Janiszewski, Stefan Mazurkiewicz)
 1928 marries Regina Barwińska
 1944 flees to Germany and settles in Hembsen, in the Nethegau, where he was brought for his own safety.
 1946 exile in Belgium
 1946 held a chair at the Royal Irish Academy in Dublin.
 1953 writes autobiography
 1956 dies in Dublin

Selected works

Books 
  2nd Edition, enlarged, 1957. Reprinted by Garland Publishing in 1987.

Papers 
 1903 "On Induction as Inversion of Deduction"
 1906 "Analysis and Construction of the Concept of Cause"
 1910 "On Aristotle's Principle of Contradiction"
 1913 "On the Reversibility of the Relation of Ground and Consequence"
 1920 "On Three-valued Logic"
 1921 "Two-valued Logic"
 1922 "A Numerical Interpretation of the Theory of Propositions"
 1928 "Concerning the Method in Philosophy"
 1929 "Elements of Mathematical Logic"
 1929 "On Importance and Requirements of Mathematical Logic"
 1930 "Philosophical Remarks on Many-Valued Systems of Propositional Logic"
 1930 "Investigations into the Sentential Calculus" ["Untersuchungen über den Aussagenkalkül"], with Alfred Tarski
 1931 "Comments on Nicod's Axiom and the 'Generalizing Deduction'"
 1934 "On Science"
 1934 "Importance of Logical Analysis for Knowledge"
 1934 "Outlines of the History of the Propositional Logic"
 1936 "Logistic and Philosophy"
 1937 "In Defense of the Logistic"
 1938 "On Descartes's Philosophy"
 1943 "The Shortest Axiom of the Implicational Calculus of Propositions"
 1951 "On Variable Functors of Propositional Arguments"
 1952 "On the Intuitionistic Theory of Deduction"
 1953 "A System of Modal Logic"
 1954 "On a Controversial Problem of Aristotle's Modal Syllogistic"

See also
 History of philosophy in Poland
 List of Poles
 Logical operators  
 Truth function  
 27114 Lukasiewicz

References

Further reading
 "Curriculum Vitae of Jan Łukasiewicz", Rome, Italy: Metalogicon journal, (1994) VII, 2 (July–December issue). 
 Craig, Edward (general editor), "Article: Jan Łukasiewicz", Routledge Encyclopedia of Philosophy, 1998, Volume 5, pp. 860–863.
 ; Słupecki, Jerzy, "The Logical Works of J. Łukasiewicz", Studia Logica 8 (1958), 7–56. JSTOR 20013604. (51 pages)
 Kotarbiński, Tadeusz, "Jan Łukasiewicz's Works on the History of Logic", Studia Logica 8 (1958), 57–63 JSTOR 20013605. (7 pages)
 Kwiatkowski, Tadeusz, "Jan Łukasiewicz – A historian of logic", Organon 16–17 (1980–1981), 169–188.
 Marshall Jr., David, "Łukasiewicz, Leibniz and the arithmetization of the syllogism", Notre Dame Journal of Formal Logic 18 (2) (1977), 235–242.

External links
 
 
 Łukasiewicz entry at Polish Philosophy Page, ed. by Francesco Coniglione (University of Catania)
 

20th-century Polish  mathematicians
Polish logicians
Philosophers of logic
University of Warsaw alumni
Academic staff of the University of Warsaw
Academics of University College Dublin
Polish Roman Catholics
Scientists from Lviv
1878 births
1956 deaths
Education ministers of Poland
Academic staff of the University of Lviv
20th-century Polish philosophers